Vestergade 3 is a Neoclassical property in the Old Town of Copenhagen, Denmark. The building was listed in the Danish registry of protected buildings and places in 1959.

History

18th century

The previous building on the site was built after the Copenhagen Fire of 1728. In the new cadastre of 1756, it was listed as No. 233 in the city's West Quarter (Vester Kvarter). The owner at that time was baker Jochum Diderichsen Greve.

At the time of the 1787 census, No. 233 was home to two households. Samuel Hey, a baker, resided in the building with his wife Sophia Halling, their sic-year-old daughter Anna Maria, three bakers, a caretaker and two maids. Iwer Helt, a busniessman (Cabus Mager), resided in the building with his wife Catrine Helt	 and two children (aged 1 and 11).

The buildings on the site was again destroyed in the Copenhagen Fire of 1795. No. 233 was subsequently merged with a section of No. 232 (No. 232 B). The current building was constructed for Peder Gielstrup in 1795–1796.

19th century

At the time of the 1801 census, No. 232 was home to four households. Peter Waagensen Gielstrup, a merchant (høkræmmer), resided in the building with his wife Ane Marie Andersen, their four children (aged nine to 16), two employees in his grocery business /one of them an apprentice), a female cook and a maid. Christen Helwadum, a secretary, resided in the building with his wife Margrethe Lange and one maid. Andreas Runge, a supercargo, resided in the building with a female cook. Johan Christian Fræk, an ironmonger (isenkræmmer), resided in the building with his wife Ane Cathrine Runge, their sevn-year-old Andres Christian Fræk, a housekeeper, a female cook and amaid.

In the new cadastre of 1806, the property was listed as No. 40. It was at that time still owned by Gielstrup. The clergy Christian Bastholm (1740-1819) was a resident of the building in 1813. The painters Albert Küchler (1803-1886) and Jørgen Roed (1808-1888) were both among the residents in 1830.

At the time of the 1840 census, No, 40 was home to three households. Christ. F. E. Bache, a customs officer, resided on the ground floor with his two sons (aged 16 and 22), the theology student Thøger Flensburg	and one maid. H. G. Bentsen, a member (deputeret) in Danish Chancery, resided on the first floor with his brother Thor Bentsen, his sister J. P. Bentsen	and one maid. Mathias Jacob Lassen, a justitsråd, resided on the second floor with the widow N. H. Ginslaug and one maid. Niels Olsen, a second hand-dealer, resided in the basement with his wife Bertha Maria, their four children (aged 13 to 25), a male servant and a maid.

20th century
 

The violin builder Pauli Merling's workshop was from 1929  and until his death in 1976 based in the basement and ground floor. The premises were in the 1990s converted into a restaurant.

Architecture
The building is seven bays wide. The keystone above the gate dates from the previous building at the site. It features a lion head and the inscription “1728 DEN 20 OCTOBER AFBRANDT“.  (1728 - 28 October burned".

A side wing extends from the rear side of the building and connects to a former warehouse at the bottom of the small courtyard.

Today
House of Souls, a cajun restaurant, is based on the lower floors.

Gallery

See also
 Vestergade 5

References

External links

 Vestergade 3 ?
 Source

Listed buildings and structures in Copenhagen
Buildings and structures completed in 1796